Mozambique–Turkey relations are the foreign relations between Mozambique and Turkey. Turkey has an embassy in Maputo since March 15, 2011 while Mozambique's ambassador in Rome is also accredited to Turkey.

Diplomatic Relations 
Turkey was initially sympathetic towards Eduardo Mondlane, a U.S-educated moderate socialist founded Frente de Libertação de Moçambique to launch armed struggle against the Portuguese even though Turkey continued to outwardly support NATO-ally Portugal. Relations between Mozambique and Turkey became very tense when Samora Machel, a hardline Marxist, became Frente de Libertação de Moçambique’s leader. Under Samora Machel, Frente de Libertação de Moçambique was notorious for giving the white Mozambicans the infamous “24/24 order”—leave in 24 hours with 24 kilos (or 53 pounds) of belongings—and nationalized most large private and church holdings. With Soviet assistance, Samora Machel persecuted northern tribes and the Catholic Church and was responsible for between 10,000 and 100,000 deaths at that time. 

Following a diplomatic thaw between Samora Machel and the U.S. Reagan in 1985, Turkey started to provide Mozambique with economic assistance, which continued after Samora Machel's successor Joaquim Chissano sped up the liberalization of the economy and announced the end of the Marxist system.

Economic Relations 
 Trade volume between the two countries was 153 million USD in 2019.
 Turkish FDI accounts for 19% of the total FDI in Mozambique.

See also 

 Foreign relations of Mozambique
 Foreign relations of Turkey

References

Further reading 
 Abrahamsson, H., and A. Nilsson. Mozambique: The Troubled Transition from Socialist Construction to Free Market Capitalism. London: Zed, 1995. 
 Ansprenger, Franz, ed. Wiriyamu: Eine Dokumentation zum Krieg in Mozambique. Munich: Kaiser, 1974.
 Cabrita, João M. Mozambique: A Tortuous Road to Democracy. New York: Palgrave, 2000.
 Egero, Bertil. Mozambique and Southern Africa Struggle for Liberation. Uppsala: Scandinavian Institute of African Studies, 1985.
 Finnegan, William. A Complicated War: The Harrowing of Mozambique. New ed. Berkeley: University of California Press, 1993. 
 Hanlon, John. Mozambique: The Revolution under Fire. London: Zed, 1984. 
 Henriksen, Thomas. Revolution and Counter-Revolution in Mozambique. Westport, Conn.: Greenwood, 1983. 
 Hoile, David. Mozambique: A Nation in Crisis. London: Claridge, 1989. 
 Hume, Cameron. Ending Mozambique's War: The Role of Mediation and Good Offices. Washington, D.C.: United States Institute of Peace Press, 1994. 
 Isaacman, Allen and Barbara Isaacman. Mozambique: From Colonialism to Revolution, 1900–1982. Boulder, Colo.: Westview, 1983.
 Schneidman, Witney W. “Conflict Resolution in Mozambique.” In David R. Smock, ed. Making War and Waging Peace: Foreign Intervention in Africa. Washington, D.C.: United States Institute of Peace Press, 1993. 
 Vines, Alex. Renamo: Terrorism in Mozambique. Bloomington: Indiana University Press, 1991. 
 Wheeler, Jack, “Mozambique.” In Michael Radu, ed. The New Insurgencies: Anticommunist Guerrillas in the Third World. New Brunswick, N.J. 1990. 

Mozambique–Turkey relations
Turkey
Bilateral relations of Turkey